Vincy may refer to:

 Les Rues-des-Vignes, a commune in northern France, known as Vincy during the Middle Ages
 The Battle of Vincy, an eighth-century battle at Les Rues-des-Vignes
 Vincy Chan (born 1982), a Chinese singer who performs under the name "Vincy"
 A national, or the country of Saint Vincent and the Grenadines

See also
 Vinci (disambiguation)